Shobaraj is an Indian actor in the Kannada film industry. Some of his notable films include Yajamana (2000), Shabdavedhi (2000), Police Story (1996), and Sangliyana Part-3 (1997).

Career
Shobaraj has been part of more than 250 Kannada films.

Selected filmography

Kannada

 Chaitrada Premanjali (1990)...Veerabhadra
 Golibar (1993)
 Lockup Death (1994)...Soori
 Bangarada Kalasha (1995)...Murgyappa's son
 Police Story (1996)...Shobaraj "Black Tiger"
 Snehaloka (1999)...Police officer
 Shabdavedhi (2000)...D'Cruz
 Galate Aliyandru (2000)
 Baava Baamaida (2001)
 Simhadriya Simha (2002)...Madesha
 Hrudayavantha (2003)
 Mourya (2004)
 Swamy (2005)...Paramashiva
 Suntaragaali (2006)...Krishnakumar Rao "Hawli Krishna"
 Deadly Soma (2005)...Babaraj
 Valmiki (2005)...Desai
 Varsha (2005)
 Ayya (2005)
 Police Story (2007)...Shobaraj "Black Tiger"
 Shankar IPS (2010)
 Sri Chowdeshwari Devi Mahime (2012)
 Kranthiveera Sangolli Rayanna (2012)...Bhandari Babu
 Power (2014)...Bharath's uncle
 Ramleela (2015)...Don Annaji
 Krishna-Rukku (2016)
 Bheeshma (2016)
 Sri Chakram (2016)
 Shalini (2016)
 Raktha Shasana (2016)
 22 July 1947 (2016)
 Bablusha (2016)
 Golisoda (2016)
 Possible (2016)
 Leela (2016)
 Jalsa (2017)
 Style Raja (2017)
 Vardhana (2017)
 Veera Ranachandi (2017)
 Roopa (2017)
 Yuddha Kanda (2017)
 Simha Hakida Hejje (2017)
 Yugapurusha (2017)
 Parchandi (2017)
 Heegondhu Dina (2018)
 Chanaksha (2019)
 Howla Howla (2019)
 Bhanu Weds Bhoomi (2019)
 Gimmick (2019)
 Gadinadu (2020)
 Om Shanti Om (2020)
 Krishna Talkies (2021)
 Gulal.com (2021)
 Kotigobba 3 (2021)...Assistant commissioner
 100 (2021)
 Govinda Govinda (2021)
 Sakath (2021)
 Rider as Inspector

TamilJaisurya (2004)Veerappu (2007)Machakaaran (2007)Sandhithathum Sindhithathum (2013)

 Awards and nominations 
Aryabhata Film Awards
 1997: Best Villain — Chikka''

See also

List of people from Karnataka
Cinema of Karnataka
List of Indian film actors

References

External links

Living people
Male actors in Tamil cinema
Male actors in Kannada cinema
Indian male film actors
Male actors from Karnataka
20th-century Indian male actors
21st-century Indian male actors
Year of birth missing (living people)